"Take a Load Off" is a song by American rock band Stone Temple Pilots. "Take a Load Off" is the second track off the band's sixth studio album, Stone Temple Pilots, released in 2010. The song was the album's second single, after the #1 hit "Between the Lines". A music video for "Take a Load Off" was released on September 8, 2010. The song was used in Shift 2: Unleashed.

Composition
"Take a Load Off" was composed by guitarist Dean DeLeo. In writing this song, singer Scott Weiland listened to and studied poetical lyricists to learn how to free his writing from his autobiographical and "self-obsessed" nature. "There's an art to telling a story, and it can mean anything, or it can mean nothing."

Charts

References

Stone Temple Pilots songs
2010 singles
Song recordings produced by Don Was
Songs written by Dean DeLeo
Songs written by Scott Weiland
2009 songs
Atlantic Records singles